is a retired Japanese diplomat who served as Vice Minister for Foreign Affairs from 2010 - 2012 and Japan's ambassador to the United States from 2012 - 2018.  He is currently President of the Japan Institute of International Affairs.

Career
Sasae joined the Japanese Ministry of Foreign Affairs in April 1974 and served in a number of key diplomatic positions dealing with Japan's foreign policy toward Asia, including as Director of the Northeast Asia Division and Director-General of the Asian and Oceania Affairs Bureau.  He served as the Vice Minister for Foreign Affairs from August 2010 until his appointment as Japanese ambassador to the United States in September 2012.

Sasae served as Deputy Director-General of Asian and Oceanian Affairs Bureau of the Japanese Ministry of Foreign Affairs, and was representative of Japan during the six-party talks to find a peaceful resolution to the security concerns as a result of the North Korean nuclear weapons program. On 19 August 2012, as Vice Foreign Minister, Sasae stated that the protests made by China are "unacceptable" and voiced regret over anti-Japanese protests in China.

Other activities
 Tikehau Capital, Member of the International Advisory Board

References

External links

after=Shinsuke Sugiyama

People from Okayama Prefecture
Living people
1951 births
University of Tokyo alumni
Ambassadors of Japan to the United States